Svinjište is a village located in the municipality of Preševo, Serbia. According to the 2002 census, the village has a population of 103 people.

References

Populated places in Pčinja District
Preševo